Andrija Ratković (born 14 November 1997) is a Serbian football forward who plays for FK Metalac Gornji Milanovac.

Club career

Javor Ivanjica
Born in Belgrade, Ratković played for Šumadija Aranđelovac and Radnički Kragujevac in youth categories, before he joined Javor Ivanjica. As a youth forward, he collected 6 First League caps usually as the substitution and scored 1 goal for the 2014–15 season. He also spent a period on trial with AEK during the season. For the 2015–16 season, Ratković was licensed for the Serbian SuperLiga, and also loaned to Serbian League West team Sloga Požega on dual registration. He made his SuperLiga debut in the 16th fixture of 2015–16 season, played on 31 October 2015. During the same season, Ratković collected 4 and 2 cup matches and scored 1 goal. In summer 2016, Ratković moved to Radnički Obrenovac on six-month loan. After the loan ended, he terminated the contract with Javor and left the club.

Other clubs
In 2017, he joined Karađorđe Topola. He played there until August 2017, where he joined Metalac. In February 2018, he was loaned out to Šumadija Aranđelovac for the rest of the season. In August 2018 he left Metalac and joined Radnički 1923.

In March 2019, Ratković joined Czech club FC Písek for a half year.

Career statistics

References

External links
 
 
 

1997 births
Living people
Footballers from Belgrade
Association football forwards
Serbian footballers
Serbian expatriate footballers
FK Javor Ivanjica players
FK Sloga Požega players
FK Radnički Obrenovac players
FK Karađorđe Topola players
FK Metalac Gornji Milanovac players
FK Šumadija Aranđelovac players
FK Radnički 1923 players
FK Proleter Novi Sad players
FK Kolubara players
Czech National Football League players
Serbian First League players
Serbian SuperLiga players
Serbian expatriate sportspeople in the Czech Republic
Expatriate footballers in the Czech Republic